Kuipers  is a Dutch occupational surname meaning cooper's. Common spelling variants include Kuiper, Kuijpers, and Kuypers. Notable people with the surname include:

 Aert H. Kuipers (1919–2012), Dutch linguist
 Alice Kuipers (born 1979), British-Canadian author
 André Kuipers (born 1958), Dutch astronaut
 Bas Kuipers (born 1994), Dutch footballer
 Benjamin Kuipers (born 1949) American computer scientist
 Benno Kuipers (born 1974), Dutch breaststroke swimmer
 Björn Kuipers (born 1973), Dutch football referee
 Dennis Kuipers (born 1985), Dutch rally driver
 Elizabeth Kuipers (born ca. 1950),  British psychologist
 Ellen Kuipers (born 1971), Dutch field hockey player
 Francis Kuipers (born 1941), British composer, guitarist and ethno-musicologist
 Frits Kuipers (1899–1943), Dutch footballer
 Harm Kuipers (born 1947), Dutch speed skater
 Helena Kuipers-Rietberg (1893–1944), Dutch resistance organiser in WWII
 Karin Kuipers (born 1972), Dutch waterpolo player
 Michel Kuipers (born 1974), Dutch footballer
 Nick Kuipers (footballer born 1992), Dutch footballer for MVV Maastricht
 Oedo Kuipers (born 1989), Dutch musical theater performer
 Oscar Kuipers (born 1956), Dutch molecular geneticist
 René Kuipers (born 1960), Dutch rally driver
 Simon Kuipers (born 1982), Dutch speed skater

See also
Mount Kuipers, a mountain in Antarctica

Dutch-language surnames
Occupational surnames